Rosario is a 2010 Philippine period drama film directed by Albert Martinez. The story was about Manuel V. Pangilinan's grandmother. The film stars Jennylyn Mercado, Dennis Trillo, Isabel Oli, Sid Lucero, and Eula Valdez and with a special participation by Dolphy. It was an official entry to the 2010 Metro Manila Film Festival.

Plot
Manny Pangilinan's uncle, Jesus (Dolphy) writes a letter to the TV5 chairman. Upon reaching to the network station, Jesus tells his nephew a story about Rosario, Jesus' mother.

Rosario (Jennylyn Mercado), is a sophisticated Filipina flapper in the 1920s who has just arrived from New York City, and is spending her vacation in their hacienda. She is the mestiza daughter of Portuguese ship captain Don Enrique (Phillip Salvador) and Filipina Doña Adela (Eula Valdez), Rosario was a passionate woman who lives according to her heart's desires. She was a woman ahead of her time.

She meets and falls in love with Vicente Velez (Yul Servo), an older man who manages the tobacco plantation owned by Rosario's family. When Rosario's father finds out about his daughter's scandalous affair, he sends Rosario to a convent.

She escapes, and elopes with Vicente to Manila where they raise a family. But Rosario's life of married bliss slowly crumbles when Vicente becomes ill with tuberculosis, and she is lured to committing adultery. Temptation and scandal still hound Rosario as she continues to defy the moral restrictions of her time.

Cast

Main cast
 Jennylyn Mercado as Rosario Pereira
 Dennis Trillo as Alberto Fernandez
 Yul Servo as Vicente Velez
 Michael V. As Nanding
 Isabel Oli as Carmen
 Sid Lucero as Carding

Minor cast
 Dolphy as the elder Hesus
 Phillip Salvador as Don Enrique Pereira
 Eula Valdez as Doña Adela Pereira
 Ricky Davao as Miguel Delgado
 Empress Schuck as Soledad Velez
 Chanda Romero as Tenant
 Liza Lorena as Jesus' Wife

Cameo appearances
 Tonton Gutierrez as Party Guest
 Dino Imperial as Party Guest
 Jaime Fabregas as Party Guest
 Rita Avila as the Helper
 Ronaldo Valdez as the Priest
 Albert Martinez as the Ship Captain
 Ara Mina as the Doctor
 Precious Lara Quigaman as the Carnival Queen
 Bing Loyzaga as the Tenant
 Liezl Martinez as Mother Superior
 Desiree Del Valle as the Party Singer
 Jamie Rivera as the Zarzuela Singer
 Chinggoy Alonzo as the Tenant
 Manny Pangilinan as Himself

Reception
The film's cast received favorable reviews from both critics and audiences.

Awards

References

External links
 
 

2010 films
Films set in the 1920s
Films set in the Philippines
2010 romantic drama films
Philippine religious epic films
Philippine romantic drama films
Philippine television films
Philippine biographical films
Flappers